This is a list of electrical generating stations in the Northwest Territories, Canada.

Although the territory is not connected to the North American power grid, there are two electric networks operating in the province, the first one in the Yellowknife area and the other in Fort Smith. In most communities, loads are served by local diesel generators. The government-owned Northwest Territories Power Corporation is in charge of power generation.

Hydroelectric 
List of all hydroelectric generating stations in the Northwest Territories.

Fossil fuel 
List of all fossil fuel electrical generating stations in the Northwest Territories.

References

See also 
 Energy in Canada
 List of electrical generating stations in Canada

Lists of power stations in Canada